Horqin Right Front Banner is a banner in the east of Inner Mongolia, China, bordering Jilin province to the southeast. It is under the administration of Hinggan League. The local Mongolian dialect is Khorchin Mongolian.

Climate

References

www.xzqh.org 

Banners of Inner Mongolia